Panamanian Americans (or ) are Americans of Panamanian descent.

The Panamanian population at the 2010 Census was 165,456.

The largest populations of Panamanians reside in Brooklyn and South Florida.

Many Panamanians reside near army based cities.  These cities include Fayetteville, NC - Fort Bragg, Killeen, TX - Fort Hood, Columbus, GA - Fort Stewart, Colorado Springs, CO - Fort Carson, Clarksville, TN - Fort Campbell, El Paso, TX - Fort Bliss and in the vicinity of Fort Dix in New Jersey.  Cities home to Navy and Air Force bases also lay claim to a concentration of Panamanians.  These include San Antonio, Hampton Roads, Jacksonville, San Diego and Tampa.

History 
The number of Panamanians who emigrated to the U.S. prior to 1960 is unknown, as the Census Bureau included them in the category of "others". By the beginning of the 20th century, the number of immigrants entering the U.S. from Panama was approximately 1,000 per year. After World War II, the number of Panamanians entering the U.S. country decreased but this changed in 1965, when immigration law allowed a maximum of 120,000 annual immigrants in the U.S. This law favored a remarkable migration from Panama, which made it one of the main migratory flows from Central America to the United States in the 1970s. Over 86,000 American people of Panamanian descent were registered in the 1990 U.S. Census.

Demographics

States 
The 10 states with the largest population of Panamanians (Source: 2010 Census):
 Florida - 28,741
 New York - 28,200
 California - 17,768
 Texas - 13,994
 Georgia - 8,678
 Virginia - 7,180
 North Carolina - 5,708
 New Jersey - 5,431
 Maryland - 5,341
 Pennsylvania - 3,234

Areas 
The largest population of Panamanians are located in the following areas (Source: Census 2010):
 New York-Northern New Jersey-Long Island, NY-NJ-PA MSA - 29,619
 Miami-Fort Lauderdale-West Palm Beach, FL MSA - 13,529
 Washington-Arlington-Alexandria, DC-VA-MD-WV MSA - 7,322
 Los Angeles-Long Beach-Santa Ana, CA MSA - 6,353
 Atlanta-Sandy Springs-Marietta, GA MSA - 5,599
 Orlando-Kissimmee-Sanford, FL MSA - 4,234
 Tampa-St. Petersburg-Clearwater, FL MSA - 3,772
 Houston-Sugar Land-Baytown, TX MSA - 3,350
 Dallas-Fort Worth-Arlington, TX MSA - 3,162
 Philadelphia-Camden-Wilmington, PA-NJ-DE-MD MSA - 2,841
 San Antonio-New Braunfels, TX MSA - 2,663
 Virginia Beach-Norfolk-Newport News, VA-NC MSA - 2,658
 Riverside-San Bernardino-Ontario, CA MSA - 2,556
 San Francisco-Oakland-Fremont, CA MSA - 2,384
 Chicago-Joliet-Naperville, IL-IN-WI MSA - 2,300
 San Diego-Carlsbad-San Marcos, CA MSA - 2,144
 Seattle-Tacoma-Bellevue, WA MSA - 2,002
 Baltimore-Towson, MD MSA - 1,877
 Fayetteville, NC MSA - 1,788
 Boston-Cambridge-Quincy, MA-NH MSA - 1,749

U.S. communities with largest population of people of Panamanian ancestry 
The top 25 U.S. communities with the highest populations of Panamanian (Source: Census 2010)
 New York City - 22,353
 Los Angeles - 2,131
 San Antonio, TX - 1,602
 Jacksonville, FL - 1,165
 Fayetteville, NC - 1,154
 Miami, FL - 1,113
 Houston, TX - 1,076
 San Diego, CA - 1,018
 Killeen, TX - 998
 Chicago, IL - 883
 Washington, DC - 742
 Boston, MA # Hillcrest Heights, FL - 1.57%
 Pemberton Heights, NJ - 1.40%
 Indian Creek, FL - 4.65%
 Lisbon, FL - 1.92%

U.S. communities with high percentages of people of Panamanian ancestry 
U.S. communities with the highest percentages of Panamanians as a percent of total population (Source: Census 2010)
 Virginia Beach, VA - 702
 Miramar, FL - 700
 Columbus, GA - 696
 Pembroke Pines, FL - 676
 Tampa, FL - 656
 Colorado Springs, CO - 642
 Newport News, VA - 615
 Charlotte, NC - 608
 Austin, TX - 607
 Orlando, FL - 596
 Clarksville, TN - 588
 El Paso, TX - 551
 Dallas, TX - 458
 Philadelphia, PA - 737

Notable people

 Rolando Blackman - former NBA player 
 Tatyana Ali - actress and singer
 Linda Martín Alcoff - philosopher
 Ra Un Nefer Amen - founder of the Pan-African religious organization  Ausar Auset Society, dedicated to providing Afrocentric-based spiritual training to people of African descent
 Cirie Fields - American reality TV contestant, famously known for competing on ‘Survivor’. 
 Nancy Ames - American folk singer and songwriter; granddaughter of former President of Panama Ricardo Joaquín Alfaro
 Gwen Ifill - American Peabody Award-winning journalist, television newscaster, and author, daughter of a Panamanian immigrant of Bajan descent
 Braulio Baeza - American Thoroughbred horse racing Hall of Fame jockey
 Cliff Clinkscales - basketball player
 Tyson Beckford - actor and model
 Uri Berenguer - play-by-play announcer for the Boston Red Sox Spanish Beisbol Network
 A. R. Bernard - founder, Senior Pastor and  CEO of Christian Cultural Center (CCC), in Brooklyn, New York; born in Panama and emigrated to New York with his family when he was four
 Aloe Blacc - singer
 Roberto Blades - Panamanian salsa singer
 Rubén Blades - salsa singer
 Jordana Brewster - actress
 Pop Smoke - rapper form New York; of Panamanian and Jamaican descent
 Jeff Buckley (1966–1997) - American singer-songwriter and guitarist; son of musician Tim Buckley; his mother was a Panama Canal Zonian of mixed Greek, French, American and Panamanian descent
 Rod Carew - Baseball Hall of Famer
 Eddie Castro - Panamanian-born jockey in American Thoroughbred horse racing
 El Chombo - American-born Panamanian producer and artist
 Billy Cobham - Panamanian American jazz drummer, composer and bandleader; Panamanian born, American raised
 Emayatzy Corinealdi - American film and television actress
 Ed Cota - American professional basketball player
 Melissa De Sousa - actress
 Ruben Douglas - professional basketball player
 Roberto Durán - Boxing Hall of Famer
 Adrian Fenty - American politician who served as the sixth mayor of the District of Columbia
 Gary Forbes - Panamanian professional basketball player who plays for the Houston Rockets
 Hulk Hogan - professional wrestler; of Italian, French and Panamanian descent
 Sam Hoger - American mixed martial artist
 David Iglesias - American attorney from Albuquerque, New Mexico
 Shoshana Johnson - former United States soldier; first black or Latina prisoner of war in the military history of the U.S.; Panamanian born and American raised
 Clark Kent
 Olga F. Linares - Panamanian–American academic anthropologist and archaeologist
 John McCain - American politician, long-time U.S. Senator from Arizona from 1987-2018, and 2008 Republican nominee for President of the United States; was born in Panama to parents who were serving in the U.S. Navy, but raised in the United States
 Scott A. Muller - American-born Panamanian Olympic slalom canoer
 Sigrid Nunez - American writer
 Demitrius Omphroy - American-born Panamanian soccer player; of Panamanian and Filipino descent
 Jeremy Renner - American actor; maternal grandmother was born in Colón
 J. August Richards - American actor; known for his portrayal of vampire hunter Charles Gunn on the WB cult television series Angel; of Panamanian descent
 Mariano Rivera - New York Yankees pitcher
 Michele Ruiz - broadcaster and founder of SaberHacer.com
 Christian Duke - American lawyer and activist
 Clarence Samuels (1900–1983) - first photographer of Latino American of African descent in the United States Coast Guard and first to command a cutter
 Tessa Thompson - American actress of Afro-Panamanian and Mexican descent
 Daphne Rubin-Vega - Panamanian-born American dancer, singer-songwriter and actress. 
 Jorge Velásquez - thoroughbred horse racing Hall of Fame jockey
 Nick Verreos - American fashion designer and contestant on the second season of the reality television program Project Runway; Greek-American father and Panamanian mother
 Juan Williams - journalist and political analyst
 Anthony Michaels - tattoo artist

See also
Panama–United States relations

References

Further reading
 Dean, Rosetta Sharp. "Panamanian Americans." Gale Encyclopedia of Multicultural America, edited by Thomas Riggs, (3rd ed., vol. 3, Gale, 2014), pp. 449-457. online
 Dolan, Edward F. Panama and the United States: Their Canal, Their Stormy Years (1990).
 Mejía, Germán. The United States Discovers Panama: The Writings of Soldiers, Scholars, Scientists, and Scoundrels, 1850-1905 (2004).

American people of Panamanian descent
Hispanic and Latino American